The 2010 Munster Senior Football Championship was that year's installment of the annual Munster Senior Football Championship held under the auspices of the Munster GAA. It was won by Kerry who defeated Limerick in the final. It was Limerick's second consecutive appearance in the final and their second consecutive loss. Limerick had not won a Munster title since 1896.

The winning Kerry team received the Munster Championship Cup, and automatically advanced to the quarter-final stage of the 2010 All-Ireland Senior Football Championship.

Bracket

Quarter-finals

Semi-finals

Final

References

External links
Munster GAA website

2M
Munster Senior Football Championship